Thomas Jackson Oakley (November 10, 1783 – May 11, 1857) was a New York attorney, politician, and judge.  He served as a United States representative from 1813 to 1815, and from 1827 to 1828, and as New York State Attorney General from 1819 to 1821.

Early life
Oakley was born in Beekman, New York on November 10, 1783.  He was the son of Jerusha (Petera) Oakley and Jesse Oakley, a farmer and veteran of the American Revolution.

He graduated from Yale College in 1801, studied law with attorney Philo Ruggles in Poughkeepsie, and was admitted to the bar in 1804.

Career
Oakley practiced first in Poughkeepsie, and later in New York City.  Among his notable cases, Oakley and Thomas Addis Emmet represented Aaron Ogden in the landmark case Gibbons v. Ogden, which the United States Supreme Court ultimately resolved in favor of Gibbons, who was represented by Daniel Webster and William Wirt.

Oakley was Surrogate of Dutchess County from 1810 to 1811.  He was elected as a Federalist to the Thirteenth United States Congress (March 4, 1813 – March 3, 1815).  During this term, Oakley was an anti-war Federalist and opposed U.S. participation in the War of 1812.

Oakley was a member of the New York State Assembly in 1816, and again from 1818 to 1820.  From 1819 to 1821, he was New York State Attorney General.

In 1826, he was again elected to Congress, serving from March 4, 1827, until May 9, 1828, when he resigned to accept a judgeship. He was a judge of the superior court of New York City from 1828 to 1847.  In 1847, he was appointed chief judge, and he served until his death in office.

In 1853, Oakley received the honorary degree of LL.D. from Union College.

Personal life
In 1808, Oakley married Lydia Williams, the daughter of Abigail (née Sayre) Williams and Robert Williams, a prominent business and political figure in Poughkeepsie.  They were the parents of a son:

 Robert Williams Oakley, a Union College graduate, attorney, and militia officer who died unmarried in 1832.

After the death of his first wife Oakley married Matilda Cruger (1809–1891); the daughter of Henry Cruger, who had the unique distinction of serving as both a member of Parliament (1774–1780; 1784–1790) and as a New York State Senator (1792–1796). Thomas and Matilda were the parents of five children, three daughters and two sons.

Oakley died May 11, 1857, and was buried at Trinity Churchyard in New York City.

Descendants
Through his daughter Matilda Cruger (née Oakley) Rhinelander (1827–1914), who married William Rhinelander, he was the grandfather of Thomas Jackson Oakley Rhinelander (1858–1946) and Philip Jacob Rhinelander (1865–1940), both of whom were prominent in New York society during the Gilded Age.

References
Notes

Books

1783 births
1857 deaths
Yale University alumni
People from Dutchess County, New York
Members of the New York State Assembly
New York State Attorneys General
New York (state) state court judges
Federalist Party members of the United States House of Representatives from New York (state)
Jacksonian members of the United States House of Representatives from New York (state)
Politicians from Poughkeepsie, New York
19th-century American politicians
Members of the United States House of Representatives from New York (state)